Karaka is a small rural area in the south of Auckland, New Zealand. Formerly part of Franklin District and under the authority of the Franklin District Council, it is now part of Auckland Council (under the Franklin Local Board) following the amalgamation of the Auckland region's councils. 

To the west of Karaka is Kingseat, a small town where the former Kingseat Psychiatric Hospital was previously located. In 2005 the hospital was turned into a haunted attraction called Spookers.

The area includes Karaka Lakes and Karaka Harbourside Estate.

History 

Between 1870 and 1900, Karaka, Waiuku and the Āwhitu Peninsula were major centres for the kauri gum industry.

Demographics

Kingseat-Karaka had a population of 2,904 at the 2018 New Zealand census, an increase of 354 people (13.9%) since the 2013 census, and an increase of 408 people (16.3%) since the 2006 census. There were 936 households, comprising 1,488 males and 1,416 females, giving a sex ratio of 1.05 males per female. The median age was 41.6 years (compared with 37.4 years nationally), with 588 people (20.2%) aged under 15 years, 465 (16.0%) aged 15 to 29, 1,464 (50.4%) aged 30 to 64, and 390 (13.4%) aged 65 or older.

Ethnicities were 85.3% European/Pākehā, 13.9% Māori, 3.9% Pacific peoples, 7.0% Asian, and 1.9% other ethnicities. People may identify with more than one ethnicity.

The percentage of people born overseas was 16.1, compared with 27.1% nationally.

Although some people chose not to answer the census's question about religious affiliation, 52.4% had no religion, 34.8% were Christian, 1.2% had Māori religious beliefs, 0.6% were Hindu, 0.8% were Muslim, 0.6% were Buddhist and 2.4% had other religions.

Of those at least 15 years old, 522 (22.5%) people had a bachelor's or higher degree, and 339 (14.6%) people had no formal qualifications. The median income was $44,200, compared with $31,800 nationally. 699 people (30.2%) earned over $70,000 compared to 17.2% nationally. The employment status of those at least 15 was that 1,284 (55.4%) people were employed full-time, 369 (15.9%) were part-time, and 60 (2.6%) were unemployed.

Economy

Karaka is now primarily a rural town associated with thoroughbred horse studs, dairy farming and sheep farming.  Karaka is the location of the thoroughbred yearling sales at New Zealand Bloodstock Karaka Sales Complex which is associated with the Karaka Million race meeting at Ellerslie. Westbury Stud and Haunui Farm are both located in Karaka.

Traditionally the economy of Karaka was dominated by agriculture. However, following the transition to lifestyle blocks, the majority of residents now commute to urban Auckland for employment.

The Karaka Sports Park provides a local sports ground as well as bar and kitchen facilities. there are also a few small restaurants in the area. The Pukekohe Golf Club is located within the Karaka area bordering Pukekohe.

A DoubleTree by Hilton hotel, opened in 2022, is situated adjacent to Papakura Interchange.

Marae

The Whātāpaka Marae and its meeting house, named Tamaoho, is a traditional meeting ground for local Māori. Three Waikato Tainui hapū are associated with the marae, primarily Ngāti Tamaoho, and secondarily Ngāi Tai and Ngāti Koheriki.

Education
Karaka School celebrated its 75th jubilee in 1978. Te Hihi School opened in 1914.

Rolls are as of 

Public secondary education is provided in the nearby towns of Papakura and Pukekohe.

References

Populated places in the Auckland Region
Populated places around the Manukau Harbour
Suburbs of Auckland
Kauri gum